The 2011 National Pro Fastpitch season was the eighth season of professional softball under the name National Pro Fastpitch (NPF) for the only professional women's softball league in the United States.  From 1997 to 2002, NPF operated under the names Women's Pro Fastpitch (WPF) and Women's Pro Softball League (WPSL). Each year, the playoff teams battle for the Cowles Cup.

Teams, cities and stadiums

Milestones and events
The Tennessee Diamonds were rebranded as the NPF Diamonds for the 2011 season.  The Diamonds were a "traveling team," playing each of their five 'home stands' at five different venues, from Calgary, Alberta to Lexington, North Carolina.

Akron Racers named as their coach Jake Schumann, who was also with Texas A&M-Corpus Christi softball coach.

NPF Diamonds signed Tim Kiernan as head coach.  Kiernan had previously coached professional softball with WPSL's Virginia Roadsters in 1999, NPF Tour Teams in 2001 and 2003, and the Sacramento Sunbirds in 2004.

The Chicago Bandits moved into their new stadium Ballpark at Rosemont.  It is the first ballpark specifically built for a women's professional softball team, and its address, 27 Jennie Finch Way, pays tribute to one of their most famous players.

Player acquisition

College draft

The 2011 NPF Senior Draft was held March 16, 2011, in Amway Center in Orlando, Florida.  The NPF Draft was broadcast on MLB.com. NPF Diamonds selected pitcher Kelsi Dunne of Alabama as the first overall pick.

Notable transactions

League standings 
Source

NPF Championship

The 2011 NPF Championship Series was held at McMurry Park in Sulphur, Louisiana August 18–21.  All four teams qualify and were seeded based on the final standings.  The first seed played the fourth seed on a best-of-three series, and the second seed played the third seed in another best-of-three series.  The winners played each other in a best-of-three series that determined the champion.

The games were broadcast on ESPN2, with color analysis by former NPF player and two-time Olympian Jennie Finch and three-time Olympian Leah O'Brien-Amico. Bernie Guenther called the play-by-play.

Championship Game

Annual awards
Source:

Award notes

See also 

 List of professional sports leagues
 List of professional sports teams in the United States and Canada

References

External links 
 

Softball teams
2011 in women's softball
2011 in American women's sports
Softball in the United States